Deh Kadeh Salami (also Romanized as Deh Kadeh Salāmī) is a village in Qarah Bagh Rural District, in the Central District of Shiraz County, Fars Province, Iran. At the 2006 census, its population was 43, in 8 families.

References 

Populated places in Shiraz County